Askani  (also known as Ashkani)  is a Baloch tribe from Balochistan known as Baloch. They are also found in Balochistan, Pakistan.

People
Akbar Askani
Liaquat Ali Askani
Doda Askani

Name
The Ferdowsi poem says that the army of Ashkash was from the wanderers of the Koch and Baloch, intent on war, with exalted cockscomb crest, whose back none in the world ever saw. 
In ancient times, Ashkan (Ashk) was the Persian name for the Parthian Kings.

In History 
Ref. Tabari, specifying Ašk as founder of the Aškānī dynasty, makes him son of Aškān the Great and a descendant of Kay - Abībēh, the son of Kay Qobād. 

Ref. Tedesco identified Parthian (Askani ) as dialect belonging to the Baluchi -Caspian group in the [Zagros hills ( Media Greater ) rather than Alburz hills ( Media Raghae ).

Ref. The Aškāni (Arsacid ) rulers in Ferdawsi 's Shāhnāma. It is 277 verses long in the Moscow edition out of the 777 rhyming couplets devoted to the Aškāni dynasty as a whole ( i . e . , it extends to more than one - third of the chapter ).

Ref. D.R. Shifiq in his , ' History of the Iranian Literature ' , writes that the word ' Pahlavi originates from Parzav , an Arsacid tribe ( akin to the Baloch tribe Puzz ).

Ref. T.Kingsmill seems to be the first scholar of ancient China to suggest that An - shi was first used to refer to the Ashkani ( Arsacid ) emperors.

See also
Baloch people
Askin, Iran
Asaak

References

Social groups of Pakistan
Baloch tribes
Pakistani names
Balochi-language surnames